Jacob Breyne (14 January 1637 – 25 January 1697) was a Polish merchant, naturalist, and artist, born in Danzig (Gdańsk), Royal Prussia (a fief of the Crown of Poland). He was the father of Johann Philipp Breyne.

Biography
Breyne was interested in plants from a young age, and collected specimens from around Danzig. He recorded where they were found and included ecological notes on each plant. He also collected specimens and plant illustrations from elsewhere, including the famous portfolio of paintings of Cape of Good Hope plants. These artworks were purchased in 1956, by Sir Ernest Oppenheimer. 

In 1661 Breyne made his first trip of many to the Netherlands. He became acquainted with prominent members of the community there who kept gardens which included some of the most beautiful and rare plants. A large number of the plants Breyne drew came from Van Beverningk, from Oud-Teilingen Sassenheim near Leiden.

Breyne died in Danzig in 1697.

Works

 Jacobi Breynii, Johann Philipp Breynii, Exoticarum aliarumque minus cognitarium plantarum centuria prima, 1678.
 Jacobi Breynii, Christian Mentzel, Pinax botanōnymos polyglōttos katholikos, Index nominum plantarum universalis, 1682.

References 

Artists from Gdańsk
1637 births
1697 deaths
Scientists from Gdańsk
17th-century German botanists
17th-century Polish botanists